Viella may refer to:

 Viella, Hautes-Pyrénées, France
 Viella, Gers, France
 Viella, the Italian name for the bowed string instrument Vielle
 Viella, an Italian academic publisher

See also
 Vielha e Mijaran, capital of the Aran Valley comarca in Catalonia, Spain. Spelled Viella in Catalan and Spanish.
 Viyella, a trademarked textile